The following is a list of numbered routes in Delaware, consisting of Interstate Highways, U.S. Routes, and state routes. The Delaware Department of Transportation is responsible for maintaining numbered roads in Delaware. State routes in Delaware use the circular highway shield. Delaware's numbering system mirrors that of U.S. Highways in that odd numbered highways travel north-south and even numbered routes go east-west. The numbers increase in value as one goes south and west respectively. There are some exceptions, however, mainly with routes from other states keeping their number as they enter Delaware, hence breaking the pattern.


History
The first numbered routes in Delaware came in 1925 with the designation of the U.S. Highway System, in which US 13, US 40, and US 113 were legislated to run through the state. In 1930 and again in 1932, the Delaware State Highway Department recommended giving numbers to state roads to supplement the existing U.S. Highway System. By 1936, Delaware began assigning numbers to state routes. In 1956, the Interstate Highway System was created, with under 40 miles of Interstate highway legislated in New Castle County.

Interstate Highways

U.S. Highways

Mainline routes

Special routes

State routes

See also

References

External links
AARoads Delaware Highways Page

 
Numbered Routes